Piotr Kantor (born May 3, 1992) is a Polish Olympic volleyball player.

References

External links
 
 
 
 
 

Polish beach volleyball players
Olympic beach volleyball players of Poland
Beach volleyball players at the 2016 Summer Olympics
1992 births
Living people
People from Sosnowiec
Beach volleyball players at the 2020 Summer Olympics